Donnie Simpson (born January 30, 1954) is a longtime American radio DJ as well as a television and movie personality. He hosted The Donnie Simpson Morning Show on Washington, D.C. radio station WPGC-FM from March 1993 to January 29, 2010. Currently, he hosts The Donnie Simpson Show on D.C.-based radio station WMMJ-FM (Majic 102.3 FM), which began airing on August 17, 2015. Simpson is the first urban-format radio personality to have an annual salary over $1 million without being syndicated.

In 2003, Simpson, through his agent and longtime friend, George Parker, inked a 6-year, 8-figure deal with WPGC-FM making Simpson the highest paid African-American radio personality ever without syndication.  He was Billboard's Radio Personality of the Year and Program Director of the Year. On August 17, 2020, it was announced that Donnie Simpson, along with six other broadcasters, would be inducted into the Radio Hall of Fame. The Class of 2020 inductees were honored during a live radio broadcast induction ceremony from multiple locations and across multiple audio platforms on October 29, 2020. Donnie has also been known by the nicknames, "Love Bug", "The Green-eyed Bandit" and "Dr. Green Eyes" for his luminous, light green eyes.

Career

Donnie Simpson is a Washington, D.C. radio, television, and movie personality. He hosted The Donnie Simpson Morning Show in morning drive for over 30 years. In 1988, Simpson was recognized as both the best (Top) radio personality and Top program director in the nation by Billboard Magazine, the world's most influential music industry publication. He received both Billboard's prestigious Radio Personality of the Year and Program Director of the Year awards.

Simpson is known for his sultry voice, warm smile and piercing green eyes. He is the son of a record shop owner. Having been exposed to multiple genres of music, Simpson began his radio career at age 15 with WJLB in Detroit, MI where he remained for eight years. He relocated to Washington D.C. in 1977 where he began working at WRC-FM, now WKYS, as a DJ and program director.  He remained with WKYS for 15 years through its format migration from Disco-based Rhythmic Contemporary Hits to Urban Contemporary in the 1980s. In 1981, Simpson landed his first television job on WRC-TV, hired as back-up anchor for the George Michael Sports Machine show on NBC's Washington outlet. Soon after he hosted Video Soul, a music video show on BET and many other network specials. Simpson eventually hosted The Donnie Simpson Morning Show on WPGC-FM for 17 years. He left radio in 2010.
 
In 1983, Simpson was recruited by Robert L. Johnson, founder of Black Entertainment Television BET, to host the network's primetime music video show, Video Soul. Simpson remained with the show until its cancellation in 1997. Over several decades, Simpson has hosted many network specials and tributes. He has interviewed well-known stars, including Stevie Wonder, Prince, Elton John, Aretha Franklin, David Bowie, Janet Jackson, James Brown, Usher, Jay-Z, Notorious BIG, Whitney Houston, Tupac, Madonna, Mariah Carey, Smokey Robinson, and many others. In 2004, Simpson was inducted into the BET Walk of Fame. In 2015, he was inducted into the Rhythm and Blues Music Hall of Fame, the only non-musician so honored at that point. On October 29, 2020, Donnie, along with six other honorees, was inducted into the Radio Hall of Fame in a live two-hour ceremony broadcast live on radio stations across the country.

Donnie retired in 2010, but returned to radio and TV on August 17, 2015, this time on WMMJ (a Radio One station based in D.C.) to host The Donnie Simpson Show. The show airs Monday through Friday from 3:00 to 7:00pm on Majic 102.3 FM. On February 5, 2016, Donnie After Dark (hosted by Donnie Simpson) began airing on TV One. On January 9, 2021, Reach Media launched The Donnie Simpson Weekend Show, a two-hour syndicated program for adult R&B-formatted radio stations.

In September 2021 Donnie Simpson's Video Soul premiered on Tubi. Simpson launched the Donnie Simpson Podcast Network (DSPN) releasing its first show, The Donnie Simpson Show Podcast on December 8, 2021. The podcast video is also available on Simpson's YouTube channel where he can be seen interviewing celebrity guests including Smokey Robinson, D.L. Hughley, Regina Belle and more.

References

External links
 
 

1954 births
African-American television personalities
African-American radio personalities
American radio personalities
American television reporters and correspondents
Living people
Urban One
Radio personalities from Detroit
21st-century African-American people
20th-century African-American people